Amy Bianca Harrison (born 21 April 1996) is an Australian international football (soccer) player, who plays for Western Sydney Wanderers in the A-League Women and the Australian national team, the Matildas.

Club career

Sydney FC
Harrison signed with Sydney FC of the Australian W-League in 2012. She made her professional debut at 16 years old in a 4–0 victory over Adelaide United.

After not playing in 2016 due to an anterior cruciate ligament injury, Harrison rejoined Sydney FC in January 2017.  In 2018–19 she was in a Sydney FC squad that won the W-League Grand Final.

Washington Spirit
In February 2019, Harrison signed with the Washington Spirit in the NWSL ahead of the 2019 season, joining fellow Sydney FC teammate, Chloe Logarzo who signed a loan deal the same day.

Western Sydney Wanderers
On 23 October 2019 Harrison signed for cross town Sydney rivals, the Western Sydney Wanderers.

International

Australia

2014 AFC Women's Asian Cup
On 6 May 2014, Harrison was selected in the 2014 AFC Women's Asian CupAustralianteam.

2019 FIFA Women's World Cup 
On 14 May 2019, Harrison was selected in the 2019 FIFA Women's World Cup Australian team.

Career statistics

Club 

1KNVB Women's Cup.
2UEFA Women's Champions League

Honours

Club
Sydney FC
 W-League Championship: 2012–13
 W-League Championship: 2018–19

Individual
 W-League Young Player of the Year: 2014

References

External links

1996 births
Living people
Australian women's soccer players
Sydney FC (A-League Women) players
Washington Spirit players
Western Sydney Wanderers FC (A-League Women) players
PSV (women) players
A-League Women players
Sportswomen from New South Wales
Australia women's international soccer players
Women's association football defenders
2019 FIFA Women's World Cup players
National Women's Soccer League players
People educated at Westfields Sports High School
21st-century Australian women